Oleksandr Volodymyrovych Kovalchuk (born February 5, 1974) is a Ukrainian public figure and politician. He lives in Zviahel, Zhytomyr Oblast. He serves as People's Deputy of Ukraine of the 9th convocation. He serves as Deputy Chairman of the Verkhovna Rada Committee on Finance, Tax, and Customs Policy. He is a Deputy Member of the Permanent Delegation to the Parliamentary Assembly of the Council of Europe. He is a member of the Political Council of the "Servant of the People" party. Outside of politics, he served as chairman of the board, co-founder of the NGO «Interaction platform "Prostir"».

References 

Servant of the People (political party) politicians
1974 births
Living people